The Women's slalom competition of the Innsbruck 1964 Olympics was held at Axamer Lizum, Austria.

The defending world champion was Marianne Jahn of Austria.

French sisters Christine Goitschel (gold) and Marielle Goitschel (silver) became the first sisters to win Olympic gold and silver in the same event.  They would repeat the double-sibling podium, switching their gold-silver order, in the giant slalom two days later.

Results

References 

Women's giant slalom
Alp
Oly